Pierre Kouada (born 29 June 1966) is a Burkinabé footballer. He played in ten matches for the Burkina Faso national football team from 1994 to 1997. He was also named in Burkina Faso's squad for the 1996 African Cup of Nations tournament.

References

External links
 

1966 births
Living people
Burkinabé footballers
Burkina Faso international footballers
1996 African Cup of Nations players
Place of birth missing (living people)
Association footballers not categorized by position
21st-century Burkinabé people